Matureivavao, or Maturei-vavao is an uninhabited atoll in the Acteon Group in the southeastern part of the Tuamotu Islands. It is the largest atoll within the Acteon Group, and like others in this group, is administratively part of the commune of the Gambier Islands.

Geography
The atoll is high enough to be visible from a considerable distance. It appears as a sandy beach, backed by a line of dark green. In bad weather, the seas sometimes sweep over the reef. There is no entrance to the lagoon.

In some maps, this atoll also appears as "Melbourne".

History
The first recorded sighting of this atoll was made during the Spanish expedition of the Portuguese navigator Pedro Fernández de Quirós on 5 February 1606 under the name Las Cuatro Coronadas (the "four crowned" (by coconut palms)), however, these observations were not fully documented. As such, the first unambiguous approach to the island was made on 14 March 1828 by the explorer Hugh Cuming in his ship Discoverer captained by Samuel Grimwood. It was previously owned by a man named Captain Nicholas but was redeemed in 1934.

Flora and fauna
After the hurricane in 1983, Matureivavao was entirely replanted with thousands of coconut trees. The atoll is home to a variety of Amaranthaceae including the genus Achyranthes aspera var. velutina.  It is also one of the few atolls in which rats were never introduced.

See also

 Tenararo
 Tenarunga
 Vahanga
 Acteon Group
 Desert island
 List of islands

References

Sailing Directions, Pub 126, "Pacific Islands" NIMA 2002; page-12

External links
Atoll list (in French)

Atolls of the Tuamotus
Islands of the Gambier Islands
Uninhabited islands of French Polynesia